A statue of Rita Pérez de Moreno is installed along the Rotonda de los Jaliscienses Ilustres, in Centro, Guadalajara, in the Mexican state of Jalisco.

The statue was created by Rubén Orozco Loza and it was installed on 27 August 2010, the 149th anniversary of her death. Her rests remain there and she was honored during a ceremony.

A statue of her husband Pedro Moreno is also installed at the site.

References

External links

 

2010 establishments in Mexico
2010 sculptures
Outdoor sculptures in Guadalajara
Rotonda de los Jaliscienses Ilustres
Sculptures of women in Mexico
Statues in Jalisco